Thomas R. Eisenmann is an American economist and currently the  Howard H. Stevenson Professor of Business Administration at Harvard Business School.

Education
1998, D.B.A., Business Policy, Harvard Business School
1983, MBA, Harvard Business School
1979, BA, Economics, Harvard College

References

Year of birth missing (living people)
Living people
Harvard Business School faculty
American economists
Harvard Business School alumni